Ittihad Riadhi Baladiat Ouargla, known as IRB Ouargla  or simply IRBO for short, is an Algerian football club based in Ouargla. The club was founded in 1977 and its colours are red and white. Their home stadium, 13 February Stadium, has a capacity of 18,000 spectators. The club is currently playing in the Algerian Ligue 2. 

In 2021,  IRB Ouargla promoted to the Algerian Ligue 2.

References

External links 

Football clubs in Algeria
Association football clubs established in 1977
Ouargla Province